Carlos Eduardo da Silva or simply Zumbi (born 7 September 1980) is a Brazilian former football striker.

Career
Born in Matelândia, Zumbi played professional football for twelve years with União (MT), Sport Club do Recife, Olária (RJ), Marília (SP), Paraná Clube and Rondonópolis Esporte Clube. As a youth, he played in Italian club U.C. Sampdoria's youth system.

In 2004, he led the Campeonato Mato-Grossense in scoring with 21 goals in 27 matches for Vila Aurora. This led to a move to Primeira Liga side Marítimo at age 25, but after failing to settle, he returned to Vila Aurora in 2005.

References

External links
CBF
sambafoot

1980 births
Living people
Brazilian footballers
Marília Atlético Clube players
C.S. Marítimo players
Nacional Futebol Clube players
Olaria Atlético Clube players
Paraná Clube players
Sport Club do Recife players
Association football forwards
União Esporte Clube players